Caio Alexandre Souza e Silva (born 24 February 1999), commonly known as Caio Alexandre, is a Brazilian professional footballer who plays as a midfielder for Fortaleza, on loan from Vancouver Whitecaps FC.

Club career

Vancouver Whitecaps FC
On 12 March 2021, Caio Alexandre joined Major League Soccer club Vancouver Whitecaps FC. In August 2021, he suffered a fracture in his left foot, and underwent successful surgery.

In April 2022, he suffered a left hand fracture.

Career statistics

Club

References

1999 births
Living people
Brazilian footballers
Association football midfielders
Campeonato Brasileiro Série A players
Major League Soccer players
Botafogo de Futebol e Regatas players
Vancouver Whitecaps FC players
Fortaleza Esporte Clube players
People from Duque de Caxias, Rio de Janeiro
Sportspeople from Rio de Janeiro (state)